Roko Badžim (born August 18, 1997) is a Croatian professional basketball player for AYOS Konyaspor of the Turkish Basketbol Süper Ligi (BSL).

Professional career

GKK Šibenik (2012–2017)
Badžim started his professional career in 2012, as a 15-years old GKK Šibenik player.

Slovenia (2017–2019)
On June 29, 2017, he signed with Slovenian champion Petrol Olimpija.

Cibona (2019–2020)
He joined Cibona in 2019 and averaged 9.4 points per game on 46% shooting from behind the arc. He was released by the team on July 15, 2020.

Konyaspor (2022–present)
On July 15, 2022, he has signed with Konyaspor of the Turkish Basketbol Süper Ligi (BSL).

National team career 
Badžim debuted for the Croatian national team in November 2021 at the 2023 FIBA Basketball World Cup qualification game against Slovenia.

Personal life 
Roko was born in 1997, in Šibenik, to a father Živko, former professional basketball player who also played in Olimpija.

References

External links
 Eurobasket.com profile
 Fiba Profile
 REALGM Profile

1997 births
Living people
ABA League players
Basketball players from Šibenik
Croatian expatriate sportspeople in Slovenia
Croatian men's basketball players
GKK Šibenik players
KK Cibona players
KK Olimpija players
Point guards
Shooting guards
Szolnoki Olaj KK players